Christine Laine is an American physician, clinical associate professor in the department of internal medicine at Jefferson Medical College, and the editor-in-chief of the Annals of Internal Medicine.

Early life and education
Laine grew up in Queens, New York City, the oldest of three daughters. As a child, she was interested in art, and her father, an engineer, encouraged her to pursue an art career, unlike her mother, who advised her to take writing classes instead. She graduated summa cum laude from Hamilton College in 1983, where she double majored in writing and biology. She then received her medical degree from the State University of New York at Stony Brook, and went on to complete her fellowship in general internal medicine and clinical epidemiology at Beth Israel Deaconess Medical Center. She later received a masters' in public health degree from Harvard University.

Editorial career
Laine first joined the Annals in June 1995 as a part-time associate editor, and became a deputy editor there in 1998 and senior deputy editor in April 2008. She was appointed the journal's editor-in-chief in April 2009, becoming the youngest person to hold this position in the history of the journal.

Personal life
Laine met her husband, David Weinberg, when she was an intern (and he was a medical student) at Cornell Medical College. Laine and Weinberg have two children together.

References

External links
 

Medical journal editors
Hamilton College (New York) alumni
American internists
Living people
Stony Brook University alumni
Harvard School of Public Health alumni
Jefferson Medical College faculty
Physicians from New York (state)
Year of birth missing (living people)
Women internists
21st-century American women physicians
21st-century American physicians
Physician-scientists
American medical researchers
Women medical researchers